Armand Hug (December 6, 1910, New Orleans - March 19, 1977, New Orleans) was an American jazz pianist.

He was born and raised in New Orleans, Louisiana, and spent most of his life there. When he was 13, he was playing professionally. In 1926 he joined a band led by Harry Shields, then was a member of the New Orleans Owls in 1928. He recorded for the first time in 1936, with Sharkey Bonano, though for his career he was known as a solo pianist. He played dixieland jazz in local clubs and hosted a local television show.

Discography
 Armand Hug (Circle, 1951)
 Armand Hug (Southland, 1954)
 Armand Hug plays Armand Piron (Paramount, 1955)
 Armand Hug & New Orleans Dixielanders (Southland, 1958)
 New Orleans Piano (Golden Crest, 1958) 
 Dixieland from New Orleans (Southland, 1959)
 Dixieland from the Southland (Southland, 1959)
 Armand Hug of New Orleans (Swaggie, 1971)
 Volume Two (Swaggie, 1974)
 Bix Hug (Jazzology, 1976)
 Piano Solos (Swaggie, 2002)
 Armand Hug Plays A. J. Piron & Other Delectable Ditties (GHB, 2012)

References

1910 births
1977 deaths
American jazz pianists
American male pianists
Jazz musicians from New Orleans
20th-century American pianists
20th-century American male musicians
American male jazz musicians
Southland Records artists